Karaikudi Sambasiva Iyer (1888 - 1958) was noted Indian classical musician and Veena player.

In 1952, he was amongst the first awardees of the Sangeet Natak Akademi Fellowship the highest honour conferred by Sangeet Natak Akademi, India's National Academy for Music, Dance and Drama.

Early life
Sambasiva Iyer was born in 1888 in Tirugokarnam, Pudukottai district as the second son to Veena Vidwan Subbiah Iyer. Sambasiva Iyer learnt Veena from his father along with his elder brother Subbarama Iyer. The duo belonged to the seventh generation to carry the family's high unbroken Veena tradition. The two brothers played together as "Karaikudi brothers" and enjoyed an unbroken career from their debut in their teens to the year 1934. Sambasiva Iyer was known for his tremendous hard work or "Asura Sadhaka". His mastery over the instrument was perfect and he constantly toiled to preserve the purity of knowledge he obtained from his ancestors.

Sambasiva Iyer did not have any issue himself. However,  as he lived in patriarchal society, he found it necessary to pass on the family legacy through a male member of the family. In 1957, he adopted Karaikudi S. Subramanian, who was the son of Subbarama Iyer's 3rd daughter Lakshmi Ammal.

Career
He taught and lived at Kalakshetra, a noted arts institution in Chennai.

He was awarded the first Sangeet Natak Akademi Award for Veena in 1952, given by the Sangeet Natak Akademi, India's National Academy of Music, Dance & Drama. Also in the same year, he was awarded the Sangita Kalanidhi Award, one of the highest awards in Carnatic music, given by Madras Music Academy.

He died in 1958.

Amongst his noted disciples are Kalaimamani and President's award winner (late) Ranganayaki Rajagopalan, Rajeshwari Padmanabhan, Jayalakshmi Sugumar and Karaikudi Subramhanian.

Karaikudi Sambasiva Iyer is not to be confused with his namesake musician Padinaindumandapa Sambasiva Iyer. PSI was much older, and guru to two recipients of Sangeet Kalanidhi award : Muthiah Bhagavatar, and his (PSI's) son  Sabhesha (सभेश) Iyer.

See also

Bibliography

References

External links
 
 Karaikudi Sambasiva Iyer Profile picture
 Conducting Veena class at Kalakshetra, Chennai

1888 births
1958 deaths
Saraswati veena players
Tamil musicians
Indian music educators
People from Sivaganga district
Sangeetha Kalanidhi recipients
Recipients of the Sangeet Natak Akademi Award
Recipients of the Sangeet Natak Akademi Fellowship
20th-century Indian musicians